Forward Thinking is a charitable organisation addressing issues related to the Middle East Peace Process and religious/secular dialogue. It was co-founded by Oliver McTernan.

Forward Thinking is funded by a diverse range of sources including: the Swiss Ministry of Foreign Affairs, the European Union, the Ministry for Foreign Affairs of Finland and a number of Trusts and private donors.

References 

Charities based in London